Rajeshwar Acharya is a Hindustani classical vocalist from Varanasi, India. In 2019, he was conferred the Padma Shri honour by the President of India for his contribution to the field of arts.

Life 
Acharya was born in Varanasi, India. He studied music from Banaras Hindu University and practiced music under Pandit Balwantrai Bhatt. He belongs to the Gwalior gharana of music. He has been associated with the arts and music department of the Banaras Hindu University and Deen Dayal Upadhyay Gorakhpur University. He retired in 2003.

References 

Year of birth missing (living people)
Living people
Recipients of the Padma Shri in arts
Hindustani singers